Huiñao is a mountain in the Andes of Peru, about  high. It lies in the Arequipa Region, La Unión Province, Cotahuasi District. What makes the mountain so special among the much higher mountains surrounding it is that it is situated in the Cotahuasi Canyon and that there are good panoramic views from its top across the Cotahuasi Canyon and the surrounding mountains. There is also an archaeological site on top of the mountain.

By the local people Huiñao is venerated as an apu.

References 

Mountains of Peru
Mountains of Arequipa Region
Archaeological sites in Peru
Archaeological sites in Arequipa Region
Inca mythology